Wampum is a traditional shell bead of the Eastern Woodlands tribes of Native Americans. It includes white shell beads hand-fashioned from the North Atlantic channeled whelk shell and white and purple beads made from the quahog or Western North Atlantic hard-shelled clam. 

In New York, wampum beads have been discovered dating before 1510. Before European contact, strings of wampum were used for storytelling, ceremonial gifts, and recording important treaties and historical events, such as the Two Row Wampum Treaty and the Hiawatha Belt. Wampum was also used by the northeastern Indigenous tribes as a means of exchange, strung together in lengths for convenience. The first colonists understood it as a currency and adopted it as such in trading with them. Eventually, the colonists applied their technologies to more efficiently produce wampum, which caused inflation and ultimately its obsolescence as currency.

Linguistic origin
The term wampum is a shortening of wampumpeag, which is derived from the Massachusett or Narragansett word meaning "white strings of shell beads". The Proto-Algonquian reconstructed form is thought to be (wa·p-a·py-aki), "white strings". 

The term wampum (or wampumpeag) initially referred only to the white beads which are made of the inner spiral or columella of the channeled whelk shell Busycotypus canaliculatus or Busycotypus carica. Sewant or suckauhock beads are the black or purple shell beads made from the quahog or poquahock clamshell Mercenaria mercenaria. Sewant or zeewant was the term used for this currency by the New Netherland colonists. Common terms for the dark and white beads are wampi (white and yellowish) and saki (dark). The Lenape name for Long Island is Sewanacky, reflecting its connection to the dark wampum.

Description and manufacture

Wampum beads are typically tubular in shape, often a quarter of an inch long and an eighth of an inch wide. One 17th-century Seneca wampum belt featured beads almost 2.5 inches (65 mm) long. Women artisans traditionally made wampum beads by rounding small pieces of whelk shells, then piercing them with a hole before stringing them. Wooden pump drills with quartz drill bits and steatite weights were used to drill the shells. The unfinished beads would be strung together and rolled on a grinding stone with water and sand until they were smooth. The beads would be strung or woven on deer hide thongs, sinew, milkweed bast, or basswood fibers.

The process to make wampum was labor-intensive with stone tools.  Only the coastal tribes had sufficient access to the basic shells to make wampum. These factors increased its scarcity and consequent value among the European traders. The introduction of European metal tools revolutionized the production of wampum, and by the mid-seventeenth century, production numbered in the tens of millions of beads. Dutch colonists discovered the importance of wampum as a means of exchange between tribes, and they began mass-producing it in workshops. John Campbell established such a factory in Pascack, New Jersey, which manufactured wampum into the early 20th century. Eventually the primary source of wampum was that manufactured by colonists, a market glutted by the Dutch.

Uses

Record-keeping and memory aids

As William James Sidis wrote in his 1935 history:

The weaving of wampum belts is a sort of writing by means of belts of colored beads, in which the various designs of beads denoted different ideas according to a definitely accepted system, which could be read by anyone acquainted with wampum language, irrespective of what the spoken language is. Records and treaties are kept in this manner, and individuals could write letters to one another in this way.

Wampum belts were used as a memory aid in oral tradition, and were sometimes used as badges of office or as ceremonial devices in Indigenous cultures, such as the Iroquois. For example, the 1820 New Monthly Magazine reports on a speech given by chief Tecumseh in which he vehemently gesticulated to a belt as he pointed out treaties made 20 years earlier and battles fought since then.

Social purposes 

Wampum strings may be presented as a formal affirmation of cooperation or friendship between groups, or as an invitation to a meeting.

The Iroquois used wampum as a person's credentials or a certificate of authority. It was also used for official purposes and religious ceremonies, and as a way to bind peace between tribes. Among the Iroquois, every chief and every clan mother has a certain string of wampum that serves as their certificate of office. When they pass on or are removed from their station, the string will then pass on to the new leader. Runners carrying messages during colonial times would present the wampum showing that they had the authority to carry the message.

As a method of recording and an aid in narrating, Iroquois warriors with exceptional skills were provided training in interpreting the wampum belts. As the Keepers of the Central Fire, the Onondaga Nation was also trusted with the task of keeping all wampum records. Wampum is still used in the ceremony of raising up a new chief and in the Iroquois Thanksgiving ceremonies.

Wampum was central to the giving of names, in which the names and titles of deceased persons were passed on to others. Deceased individuals of high office are quickly replaced, and a wampum inscribed with the name of the deceased is laid on the shoulders of the successor, who may shake it off and reject the transfer of name. The reception of a name may also transfer personal history and previous obligations of the deceased (e.g., the successor of a person killed in war may be obligated to avenge the death of the name's previous holder, or care for the deceased person's family as their own).

... the Iroquoians (Five Nations and Huron alike) shared a very particular constitution: they saw their societies not as a collection of living individuals but as a collection of eternal names, which over the course of times passed from one individual holder to another.

Just as the wampum enabled the continuation of names and the histories of persons, the wampum was central to establishing and renewing peace between clans and families. When a man representing his respective social unit met another, he would offer one wampum inscribed with mnemonic symbols representing the purpose of the meeting or message. The wampum, thus, facilitated the most essential practices in holding the Iroquois society together.

Currency
When Europeans came to the Americas, they adopted wampum as money to trade with the native peoples of New England and New York. Wampum was legal tender in New England from 1637 to 1661. It continued as currency in New York until 1673 at the rate of eight white or four black wampum equalling one stuiver, meaning that the white had the same value as the copper duit coin. The colonial government in New Jersey issued a proclamation setting the rate at six white or three black to one penny; this proclamation also applied in Delaware. The black shells were rarer than the white shells and so were worth more, which led people to dye the white and dilute the value of black shells.

In the writings of Robert Beverley Jr. of Virginia Colony about tribes in Virginia in 1705, he described peak as referring to the white shell bead, valued at 9 pence a yard, and wampom peak as denoting the more expensive dark purple shell bead, at the rate of 1 shilling and 6 pence (18 pence) per yard. He added that these polished shells with drilled holes were made from the cunk (conch), while another currency of lesser value called  was fashioned from the cockleshell.

Wampum briefly became legal tender in North Carolina in 1710, but its use as common currency died out in New York by the early 18th century.

Recent developments 

 The National Museum of the American Indian repatriated eleven wampum belts to Haudenosaunee chiefs at the Onondaga Longhouse Six Nations Reserve in New York. These belts dated to the late 18th century and are sacred to the Longhouse religion. They had been away from their tribes for over a century.

 The Seneca Nation commissioned replicas of five historic wampum belts completed in 2008. The belts were made by Lydia Chavez (Unkechaug/Blood) and made with beads manufactured on the Unkechaug Indian Nation Territory on Long Island, New York.

 In 2017, a wampum belt purchased by Frank Speck in 1913 was returned to Kanesatake, where it is used in cultural and political events.

 The Shinnecock Indian Nation has sought to preserve a traditional wampum manufacturing site called Ayeuonganit Wampum Ayimꝏup (Here, Wampum Was Made). A portion of the original site, Lot 24 in today's Parrish Pond subdivision in Southampton, Long Island, has been reserved for parkland.

 The Unkechaug Nation on Long Island, New York, has built a wampum factory which manufactures traditional as well as contemporary beads for use by Native artists such as Ken Maracle, Elizabeth Perry, and Lydia Chavez in their designs of traditional belts and contemporary jewelry. The factory has been in existence since 1998 and has been instrumental in the resurrection of the use of wampum in contemporary native life.

 Traditional wampum makers in modern times include Julius Cook (Sakaronkiokeweh) (1927–1999) and Ken Maracle (Haohyoh), a faith keeper of the Lower Cayuga Longhouse.

 Artists continue to weave belts of a historical nature, as well as designing new belts or jewelry based on their own concepts.

See also

 Economy of the Iroquois
 Great Law of Peace
 Hiawatha Belt
 Quipu – Quechua recording devices made of knotting and dyed strings
 Shell money

References

External links

 Wampum article, Iroquois Indian Museum
 Wampum History and Background
 "The Tribes And The States: 100,000-Year History of North America"
 X-ray showing inner spiral and entire shell of the Busycotypus Canaliculatus - Channeled Whelk Shell, Europa
 "Money Substitutes in New Netherland and Early New York", Coins, University of North Dakota
 Wampum—Onondaga Nation
 1764 Treaty of Fort Niagara Wampum Belts

American Indian relics
Currencies of ancient Americas
First Nations culture
History of the Thirteen Colonies
Indigenous beadwork of the Americas
Indigenous culture of the Northeastern Woodlands
Iroquois culture
Proto-writing